Volvic is a commune in the Puy-de-Dôme department in Auvergne in central France.

The church at Volvic is dedicated to “St Priest” (Projectus), who is reputed to have been killed here in 676 AD.

Population

International relations

Volvic is twinned with:

 Unterschneidheim, Germany
 Kirriemuir, Angus, Scotland

Gallery

See also
 Égaules
Communes of the Puy-de-Dôme department

References

External links

City Official Website
Volvic Tourism Board
 (commercial link) Volvic Mineral Water

Communes of Puy-de-Dôme